Ruth Thane McDevitt ( Shoecraft; September 13, 1895 – May 27, 1976) was an American film, stage, radio, and television actress.

Career
The daughter of John Barnabas Shoecraft and Elizabeth Imber Shoecraft, McDevitt was born in Coldwater, Michigan, but grew up in Ohio. After attending the American Academy of Dramatic Arts, she married Patrick McDevitt on December 10, 1928, and decided to devote her time to her marriage. After her husband's death in 1934, she returned to acting. She made her debut on Broadway in 1940, and succeeded her friend Josephine Hull in Arsenic and Old Lace, Harvey, and The Solid Gold Cadillac.

McDevitt also acted on radio, portraying the title character's mother in Keeping up with Rosemary and Jane in This Life Is Mine.

On television, McDevitt portrayed Bessie Thatcher in the DuMont drama A Woman to Remember (1949). She played Mom Peepers in the 1950s sitcom Mister Peepers and Grandma Hanks on CBS's Pistols 'n' Petticoats. She was a regular on The Everly Brothers Show and the NBC soap Bright Promise from September 1969 to June 1970. McDevitt also had a regular role as Emily Cowles on Kolchak: the Night Stalker, starring Darren McGavin.

McDevitt guest starred in such series as Suspense, Cosmopolitan Theatre, Decoy, The United States Steel Hour, Westinghouse Studio One, The Alfred Hitchcock Hour (2 episodes), The Andy Griffith Show (2 episodes), The Debbie Reynolds Show, The Ghost & Mrs. Muir, Mayberry R.F.D., I Dream of Jeannie, Bewitched (3 episodes), The Courtship of Eddie's Father, Love, American Style, That Girl, Nanny and the Professor, Room 222, Mannix (2 episodes), Here's Lucy, Gunsmoke, Marcus Welby, M.D., Phyllis, Little House on the Prairie, The Streets of San Francisco, Naked City, and All in the Family (on which she had a recurring role during 1974 and 1975).

Her film debut was in The Guy Who Came Back (1951), followed by memorable roles in The Parent Trap (as camp counselor Miss Inch),
Alfred Hitchcock's The Birds (as Mrs. MacGruder, the pet store saleslady), Boys' Night Out, Dear Heart, The Shakiest Gun in the West, Angel in My Pocket, The Love God?, Change of Habit, The War Between Men and Women, and Mixed Company.

Death
McDevitt died, aged 80, in Hollywood, Los Angeles, California and is interred in Westwood Village Memorial Park Cemetery.

Filmography

She also appeared in a Streets of San Francisco episode "Winterkill" from season 2 on December 13, 1973

References

External links

Ruth McDevitt at the University of Wisconsin's Actor Studio audio collection

	

Actresses from Michigan
American Academy of Dramatic Arts alumni
American film actresses
American radio actresses
American soap opera actresses
American stage actresses
American television actresses
20th-century American actresses
Burials at Westwood Village Memorial Park Cemetery
1895 births
1976 deaths
People from Coldwater, Michigan